Pasteur's dwarf gecko (Lygodactylus arnoulti), also commonly known as Arnoult's gecko, is a species of gecko, a lizard in the family Gekkonidae. The species is native to Madagascar.

Etymology
The specific name, arnoulti, is in honor of French ichthyologist Jacques Arnoult (1914–1995).

Habitat

Reproduction
L. arnoulti is oviparous.

References

External links
https://web.archive.org/web/20070929013959/http://www.zooinstitutes.com/Zoology/continents.asp?name=AFRICA

Further reading
Glaw F, Vences M (2006). A Field Guide to Amphibians and Reptiles of Madagascar, Third Edition. Cologne, Germany: Vences & Glaw Verlag. 496 pp. .
Pasteur G (1965). "Notes préliminaires sur les lygodactyles (gekkonidés). IV. Diagnoses de quelques formes africaines et malgaches ". Bulletin du Muséum National d'Histoire Naturelle, Paris 36: 311–314. (Lygodactylus arnoulti, new species). (in French).
Röll B (2004). "Lygodactylus arnoulti Pasteur". Sauria Supplement 26 (3): 613–616. (in German).
Rösler H (2000). "Kommentierte Liste der rezent, subrezent und fossil bekannten Geckotaxa (Reptilia: Gekkonomorpha)". Gekkota 2: 28–153. (Lygodactylus arnoulti, p. 92). (in German).

Arnoulti
Reptiles described in 1965
Reptiles of Madagascar
Endemic fauna of Madagascar